Nathaniel Ames (October 9, 1741 – July 20, 1822) represented Dedham, Massachusetts in the Great and General Court.

Personal life
Ames was born on October 9, 1741, to Dr. Nathaniel Ames and Deborah Ames. His brother was Fisher Ames. He had polar opposite political views from Fisher, and very different social styles as well. Nathaniel "enjoyed his role as country doctor, servant of the proletariat, and champion of the common man." He became the leader of the Democratic-Republican Party in Dedham. He was most at home around the farmers and laborers with whom he grew up. Fisher, on the other hand, liked to dress well, hobnob with Boston society, and was an influential Federalist. Fisher operated his law practice out of the first floor of the Ames Tavern. Ames believed the two greatest threats to America were "pettifoggers," a derogatory term he used to describe lawyers, and "Fudderalists."

Ames was the administrator of his father's estate but, 23 years after his death, Ames still had not made a settlement among the heirs. Fisher increased his protests until the point that Ames finally settled all their father's affairs, but never forgave his family for rushing him. As was just about everything he did in life, Fisher's death on July 4, 1808, was an annoyance to his brother Nathaniel. Nathaniel had arraigned for a funeral in Dedham and had sent details to a printer to be published. George Cabot sent an employee to speak to Fisher's widow about hosting the funeral in his home. The widow agreed. Nathaniel believed Cabot's intentions were to embarrass the Town of Dedham for its Republican political views and did not attend.

He was married to Melitiah Shuttleworth by Rev. William Clark on March 13, 1775, but it was not a happy marriage. He wrote in his diary that some of the best advice he ever got was "Of all the foolish things you do, let marriage be the last," and that he had "discovered worse malignancy in my bosom friend  that I conceived it possible to dwell in human shape." His wife forbid him from frequenting taverns, depriving him of both social and business contacts.

The couple took in Melitiah's niece, Hannah Shuttleworth, when the girl was 16 years old. When Ames died in 1822, he left his fortune to his wife and, upon her death, to the unmarried Hannah, his closest living relative.

He became known around Dedham as "Grumbleton the Jacobinite." The list of people and groups he disliked was as long as his prejudices were extreme. He would also frequently create caricature names for them, such as "Prigarchy" for John Adams, lawyers in general, anything British, and Federalists.
He attended Harvard College, graduating in 1761. He went on to earn a second degree at Harvard as well. There he would make connections with a number of individuals who would serve in the American Revolution and in the new American government.

Career

The town first elected Ames to the Great and General Court in 1790, but he refused the office. The following year he was elected again and accepted "upon [the town's] acceptance to dispense with my attendance... I consider myself as a nominal Representative only to save the Town from being fined."

Following his father's death, Ames took on his medical practice and his almanac publishing business.  He would also teach in the Dedham Public Schools and in Needham, Massachusetts.

After the Norfolk County was created in 1792, the Court of Common Pleas and the Court of General Sessions of the Peace first met in the Dedham's meetinghouse. Ames was chosen as the clerk of both and they met for the first time on September 23. He was removed from both positions in August 1797 by the new Federalist administration. Ames saw political revenge as the reason for the sacking, but those responsible claimed that he had "so interlarded the books with ebullitions of spleen, nonsense, and blackguardism, that it became necessary, for the preservation of the records, to remove him.

In 1793, he was upset that Samuel Haven was selected to be register of probate over him and claimed it was only through the "solicitation, lying, and intrigue" of Haven's father, Rev. Jason Haven, that he got the position. Like his father before him, Ames frequently feuded with the elder Haven.

Revolutionary war
After the Battles of Lexington and Concord, Ames tended to the wounded. One patient was Israel Everett, from whose arm he removed a musket ball.

See also
 Ames family

Notes

References

Works cited

Members of the Massachusetts General Court
1741 births
1802 deaths
Educators from Dedham, Massachusetts
Businesspeople from Dedham, Massachusetts
People from colonial Dedham, Massachusetts
Politicians from Dedham, Massachusetts
Harvard College alumni